Jingye Temple may refer to:

 Jingye Temple (Shaanxi), in Xi'an, Shaanxi, China
 Jingye Temple (Guangdong), in Yangxi County, Guangdong, China
 Jingye Temple (Jiangsu), in Jiangyan, Jiangsu, China
 Jingye Temple (Jiangxi), in Dingyuan County, Jiangxi, China